Krasnokutsk Raion was a raion (district) in Kharkiv Oblast of Ukraine. Its administrative center was the urban-type settlement of Krasnokutsk. The raion was abolished on 18 July 2020 as part of the administrative reform of Ukraine, which reduced the number of raions of Kharkiv Oblast to seven. The area of Krasnokutsk Raion was merged into Bohodukhiv Raion. The last estimate of the raion population was 

At the time of disestablishment, the raion consisted of one hromada, Krasnokutsk settlement hromada with the administration in Krasnokutsk.

References

Former raions of Kharkiv Oblast
1923 establishments in Ukraine
Ukrainian raions abolished during the 2020 administrative reform